Orin Fowler (July 29, 1791 – September 3, 1852) was a U.S. Representative and anti-smoking activist from Massachusetts.

Biography

Born in Lebanon, Connecticut, Fowler pursued classical studies and attended Williams College, Williamstown, Massachusetts.
He graduated from Yale College in 1814.
He studied theology and pursued extensive missionary work in the Valley of the Mississippi.
Finally settled as a minister in Plainfield, Connecticut, in 1820.
He moved to Fall River, Massachusetts, in 1829, where he was installed as pastor of the Congregational Church in 1831.
Wrote a history of Fall River in 1841.
He served in the State senate in 1848.

Fowler was elected as a Whig to the Thirty-first and Thirty-second Congresses and served from March 4, 1849, until his death in Washington, D.C., September 3, 1852.
He was interred in the North Burial Ground, Fall River, Massachusetts.

Anti-smoking

Fowler was a leading opponent of tobacco-smoking. In 1842, he authored A Disquisition on the Evils of Using Tobacco.

Selected publications

A Disquisition on the Evils of Using Tobacco (1842)
History of Fall River: With notices of Freetown and Tiverton (1862)

See also
List of United States Congress members who died in office (1790–1899)

References

External links
 
 

1791 births
1852 deaths
Anti-smoking activists
People from Lebanon, Connecticut
Williams College alumni
Whig Party members of the United States House of Representatives from Massachusetts
19th-century American politicians
Massachusetts state senators
Politicians from Fall River, Massachusetts
Yale College alumni